A drawing tower produces a fine filament by heating the tip of a preform to melting temperature and pulling a strand of molten material downward.  Industrial drawing towers range in height from 30 to 45 meters.  A drawing tower is used in the production of fiber optic communication cables.  The preform is a multi-layered cylinder typically 20 cm in diameter, and 2 m long.

References

Optical fiber